White Dagoba may refer to either of two white stupas located in Beijing, China:

 the White Dagoba located on Jade Flower Island in Beihai Park
 the White Dagoba located in Miaoying Temple